Stepan Kuntsevich (born 11 May 1996) is a Belarusian professional footballer.

References

External links 
 
 

1996 births
Living people
Belarusian footballers
Association football midfielders
FC Gorodeya players
FC Molodechno players